The 1998 Superflo Superflo 12 Hours of Sebring was the 46th running of the 12 Hours of Sebring.  It also served as the inaugural round of the 1998 IMSA GT Championship season. It took place at Sebring International Raceway, Florida, on March 22, 1998.

Race results
Class winners in bold.

Statistics
 Pole Position - #7 Doyle-Risi Racing - 1:55.052
 Average Speed -

External links
 Race Results
 Photo Gallery

Sebring
12 Hours of Sebring
12 Hours of Sebring
12 Hours
12 Hours of Sebring